William H. Glasper (q4 1910 – q3 1965) was an English footballer who played at left half or inside right in the Football League for Tranmere Rovers and Darlington. He was on the books of Sheffield Wednesday without representing them in the league, and played for Northern League club South Bank and Midland League club Mexborough Athletic.

Life and career
Glasper was born in 1910 in Middlesbrough, Yorkshire, and played football for Middlesbrough-based Northern League club South Bank before signing for Sheffield Wednesday of the Football League First Division in the 1931–32 season. He never played for the first team, and moved on to Midland League club Mexborough Athletic in December 1932. He had played at left half for South Bank, but Wednesday thought of him as a forward, and Mexborough played him at inside right.

He signed for Tranmere Rovers in 1933, and made 18 appearances in the Third Division during two years with the club. He appeared more regularly in other competitions. He scored Tranmere's equaliser in the 1934 Welsh Cup Final against Bristol City, played on the losing side in the replay, and scored twice in a 6–1 defeat of Southport in the 1935 Northern Section Cup. His only Third Division goal came in a 4–1 win against Darlington in March 1935, and he joined that club at the end of the season. Although he played mainly for the reserves, he was retained for a second season, and finished his Darlington career with eight Third Division appearances without scoring.

Glasper died in 1965 at the age of 54.

Notes

References

1910 births
1965 deaths
Footballers from Middlesbrough
English footballers
Association football wing halves
Association football inside forwards
South Bank F.C. players
Sheffield Wednesday F.C. players
Middlesbrough F.C. players
Mexborough Athletic F.C. players
Tranmere Rovers F.C. players
Darlington F.C. players
Northern Football League players
Midland Football League players
English Football League players